Eatoniellidae, commonly known as eatoniellids, are a taxonomic family of minute sea snails, marine gastropod molluscs in the superfamily Cingulopsoidea.

According to taxonomy of the Gastropoda by Bouchet & Rocroi (2005) the family Eatoniellidae has no subfamilies.

Genera
Genera within the family Eatoniellidae include:
 Crassitoniella Ponder, 1965
 Eatoniella Dall, 1876
 Liratoniella Ponder, 1965
 Pupatonia Ponder, 1965
Genera brought into synonymy
 Eatonia E.A. Smith, 1875: synonym of Eatoniella Dall, 1876

References

Further reading 
 Powell A. W. B., New Zealand Mollusca, William Collins Publishers Ltd, Auckland, New Zealand 1979 
 ZipCodeZoo
 Ponder W.F., 1965 [15 October], The family Eatoniellidae in New Zealand. Records of the Auckland Institute and Museum, 6(2): 47-100, pls. 1-4
 Ponder W.F. & Yoo E.K. 1980. A review of the genera of Cingulopsidae with a revision of the Australian and tropical Indo-Pacific species (Mollusca: Gastropoda: Prosobranchia). Records of the Australian Museum 33, 1-88

 
Taxa named by Winston Ponder